The 2017 season was Kashima Antlers' 25th consecutive season in the J1 League, the top-division of professional football in Japan. In addition to the league campaign, the club also competed in the Emperor's Cup, League Cup, Super Cup, and AFC Champions League.

Squad

Competitions

J1 League

Table

Matches

Emperor's Cup

Third round

Fourth round

Quarter-final

J.League Cup

Quarter-final

|}

Japanese Super Cup

AFC Champions League

Group stage

Round of 16

2–2 on aggregate. Guangzhou Evergrande won on away goals.

References

External links
 J.League official site

Kashima Antlers
Kashima Antlers seasons